William Theodore Charles Sonntag was an All Blacks rugby union player from Dunedin, New Zealand.  He was a Lock.

He played eight matches including three tests for the All Blacks when they toured Australia in 1929, and had been selected for the team on his 35th birthday. He was the tenth oldest All Black; see player records

He was born in Dunedin, and educated at King Edward Technical College. He played 60 times for Otago in a sixteen year career. He served as a Lance-Corporal with the Wellington Mounted Rifles Regiment during World War I and served in New Zealand only during World War II. He was president and a life member of the Kaikorai Club. His uncle T. Sonntag played for Otago and the South Island.

He died in Dunedin on 30 June 1988, aged 94.

References 
The Encyclopaedia of New Zealand Rugby by Ron Palenski, Rod Chester & Neville McMillan, pages 196-7 (4th edition 2005, Hodder Moa Beckett, Auckland)  

1894 births
1988 deaths
New Zealand rugby union players
New Zealand international rugby union players
People educated at King Edward Technical College
New Zealand military personnel of World War I
New Zealand military personnel of World War II
Rugby union locks
Rugby union players from Dunedin